Ayla Ranzz, known originally as Lightning Lass (also known as Light Lass and Spark) is a character appearing in media published by DC Comics. She is a member of the Legion of Super-Heroes in the 30th and 31st centuries, as well as the sister of Lightning Lad and Lightning Lord.

There have been three versions of Ayla since her original debut; these versions are separated by the events of both the Zero Hour and Infinite Crisis limited series.

Fictional character biography

Silver Age

Ayla Ranzz (of the planet Winath, where twinning is normal) first appeared in Adventure Comics #308, (May 1963). She is the twin sister of fellow Legionnaire Garth (Lightning Lad) and the younger sister of the villainous Mekt (Lightning Lord). All three gained their lightning powers after being attacked by creatures called lightning beasts on the "lightning world" of Korbal. She originally joined the Legion disguised as her brother Lightning Lad, claiming to be her brother back from the dead, after Lightning Lad's apparent death at the hands of Zaryan. Her being an imposter was soon discovered, but she was admitted into the Legion as Lightning Lass.

For many years she was called Light Lass, after Dream Girl used the science of her homeworld Naltor to change Ayla's lightning powers with the ability to make objects super-lightweight, or anti-gravity powers (The Light Lass powers were explained both ways over the years).

Years later, Ayla left the Legion for a time, disillusioned with her Legion career and having ended a lengthy romance with fellow Legionnaire Timber Wolf. She broke up with him following a misunderstanding when she saw Timber Wolf embracing her sister-in-law Saturn Girl when both were stranded on a frozen asteroid.  Eventually returning to Winath, Ayla was kidnapped by her brother Lightning Lord and a faction of the Legion of Super-Villains. When Ayla refused to join them, her brother tried to kill her by sending millions of volts of electricity through her body.  However, Ayla survived and discovered that her original lightning powers had been restored. After the LSV was defeated, she rejoined the Legion as Lightning Lass.

During the "Five Year Later" storyline it was revealed that Ayla had entered into a long-term same-sex relationship with Shrinking Violet.

During the "Five Year Gap" following the Magic Wars, Earth fell under the covert control of the Dominators, and withdrew from the United Planets. A few years later, the members of the Dominators' highly classified "Batch SW6" escaped captivity. Originally, Batch SW6 appeared to be a group of teenage Legionnaire clones, created from samples apparently taken just prior to Ferro Lad's death at the hands of the Sun-Eater. Later, they were revealed to be time-paradox duplicates, every bit as legitimate as their older counterparts. After Earth was destroyed in a disaster reminiscent of the destruction of Krypton over a millennium earlier, a few dozen surviving cities and their inhabitants reconstituted their world as New Earth. The SW6 Legionnaires remained, and their version of Ayla Ranzz (possessing the Light Lass powers) assumed the code name Gossamer.

Post-Zero Hour (Spark)

Ayla, known as Spark, originally joined the Legion as a replacement for her twin brother Live Wire, as their planet Winath decided to choose her rather than Garth, who had been classified as a runaway. Eventually, the "one member per planet" restriction was lifted, and he rejoined.

She was one of the Legion members stranded in the 21st Century for a time as a result of the Emerald Eye's machinations. Her team helped the modern superheroes during the Final Night crisis, where Earth's sun was slowly being devoured. Spark personally provides the electricity to Guy Gardner's Warriors facility when the power went out while it was being used as a hospital. Some time after the sun was restored, she travels into the Source, which replaces her electrical powers with anti-gravity powers (although she did not change her codename). Upon returning to her native 31st Century and reuniting with her brother, however, she began to experience debilitating headaches when using her powers; the headaches were diagnosed as psychosomatic. Apparently, she could not handle having different powers than her brother. In a desperate attempt to restore her old powers, she returned to Korbal, the planet where she and her brothers originally gained their powers after being shocked by a "Lightning Beast" (which, at the time, had left them in a coma for months). Her altered genetic structure left her unable to take another blast, however, and she was killed. Shortly afterward, her brother and some of their teammates, who had followed her, arrived. In grief, Garth let off a huge blast which temporarily revived her, and Doctor Gym'll theorized that a greater blast could properly revive her and restore her electrical powers. By channeling a huge amount of atmospheric electricity, Garth succeeded. Shortly afterward, she became romantically associated with fellow Legionnaire Chameleon, who had a longstanding crush on her.

Later, the Legion was disbanded after the apparent death of several of her teammates (including her brother and Chameleon) and she returned to Winath. When these teammates returned, Garth was not among them, having apparently sacrificed himself so the rest could return home. After Chameleon broke this news to her, she apparently did not resume her relationship with him. She briefly took the name Live Wire after this, but shortly before his return, she was convinced by the second Kid Quantum that she'd be better honoring her brother by being herself.

Threeboot (Light Lass)

Following another reboot of Legion continuity, Ayla Ranzz is again called Light Lass, and has gravity nullifying powers. In Supergirl and the Legion of Super-Heroes #26, it is revealed that she, like her siblings, had previously gained lightning powers after the accident on Korbal before another unspecified accident gave her gravitational powers.

Light Lass had a reputation as the Legion's "party girl", and  had relationships with Ultra Boy, Timber Wolf, and Sun Boy, as well as a one-night stand with Karate Kid. Brainiac 5 commented that he finds it aggravating that the ability to negate one of the fundamental forces is in the hands of someone who treats things so flippantly. She however has been shown to take some things seriously, most notably dealing with her brother Mekt.

Ayla took a very serious, and active role in assisting her brother Garth when he became Legion Leader following Supergirl's return to her time. Ayla also assisted Brainiac 5 and Star Boy in stabilizing gravity after an intruder planet appeared in the Sol system.

Post-Infinite Crisis - Return of original Lightning Lass
The events of the Infinite Crisis miniseries restored a close analogue of the Pre-Crisis Legion to continuity, as seen in "The Lightning Saga" story arc in Justice League of America and Justice Society of America, and in the "Superman and the Legion of Super-Heroes" story arc in Action Comics,  Ayla Ranzz is included in the Legion, possessing her original powers as Lightning Lass.

In the Lightning Saga, it was initially implied that she was presumed dead by Timber Wolf, who said "I'm coming, Ayla" as he was about to sacrifice his life. It was later revealed that the two have reconciled and are once again in a romantic relationship. She appears in the Superman and the Legion of Super-Heroes arc, serving as the power source for the hidden Legion headquarters.

Ayla is next seen in Final Crisis: Legion of 3 Worlds #1, where she used her abilities to hold open the entrance to the Phantom Zone so her fellow Legionnaires Shadow Lass and Phantom Girl can rescue Mon-El. Ayla destroyed the Zone machine before Kryptonian criminal Zod has a chance to escape. She and her counterparts were later used as part of an experiment by Brainiac 5 to restore Bart Allen, with Ayla and Spark providing XS with lightning charges, and Light Lass using her gravity powers to prevent XS from becoming a singularity. Light Lass is later needed to extract the Kryptonian Chrysalis buried deep within Superman's Fortress of Solitude, buried there a thousand years ago by Starman.

Ayla was later seen in issue #6 of Paul Levitz's new Legion of Superheroes series, where she was shown preparing to go on a holiday vacation with Shrinking Violet. It is subsequently revealed that the two are romantically involved. Following the cancellation of the Legion of Superheroes series (and the Legion's disbanding), Ayla is depicted back home on Winath, but it is unclear whether Shrinking Violet is living with her there.

Powers and abilities
 As Lightning Lass, Ayla has the superhuman ability to generate electricity, usually in the form of lightning bolts.
 As Spark, Ayla has the ability to generate electricity, and direct bolts of it accurately, which she commonly refers to as "lightning". She briefly possessed the ability to reduce objects' density, but has shown no sign of this since the restoration of her electrical powers.
 As Light Lass in the Threeboot continuity, Ayla has the power to cancel and control gravity.

Equipment
As a member of the Legion of Super-Heroes, she is provided a Legion Flight Ring. It allows her to fly and protects her from the vacuum of space and other dangerous environments.

Reception
Ayla Ranzz was ranked 47th in Comics Buyer's Guide's "100 Sexiest Women in Comics" list.

In other media
 Lightning Lass makes a cameo appearance in the Superman: The Animated Series episode "New Kids In Town".
 Ayla appears in the Legion of Super Heroes episode "Chained Lightning", voiced by Kari Wahlgren. This version lost her physical form and became a disembodied energy being in the same Lightning Beast attack that gave Lightning Lad his powers. She is later discovered in a space storm that Imperiex is siphoning to power a weapon, and is restored to life by Mekt and Garth.
 Lightning Lass appears in a photograph alongside Star Boy in Justice League vs. the Fatal Five.

References

External links
Gay League Profile
A Hero History Of Lightning Lass

Characters created by Edmond Hamilton
Characters created by John Forte
Comics characters introduced in 1963
DC Comics aliens
DC Comics extraterrestrial superheroes
DC Comics female superheroes
DC Comics LGBT superheroes
Fictional bisexual females
Fictional twins
Fictional characters with electric or magnetic abilities
Fictional characters with absorption or parasitic abilities
Fictional characters with gravity abilities